Ravana is a 2009 Indian Kannada-language film directed by Yogish Hunsur starring Yogesh and Sanchita Padukone in lead roles. The film is a remake of the Tamil-language film Kaadhal Kondein (2003).

Cast

 Yogesh as Vinod
 Sanchita Padukone as Divya
 Santhosh Kumar as Adhi
 Dwarakish
 Srinivasa Murthy
 Ninasam Ashwath
 Srinath Vasista
 K V Manjaiah

Music

Reception

Critical response 

A critic from The New Indian Express wrote  "Music director Abhiman has provided melodious music. It is worth watching for those who love action films and have not watched the Tamil or Telugu versions". B S Srivani from  Deccan Herald wrote  "So has R Giri’s camerawork, supported by a good finish. But ‘Ravana’ is guilty. Of cleverly inserting the flashback scenes of the original (where the detailing was perfect, down to the boy resembling Dhanush) and getting dubbing artistes to work on them. Perhaps this is one such money-saving method the producers are desperately looking for. A sham. However, Yogesh fans can look forward to a slew of ‘anti-hero’ roles from him". A critic from The Times of India scored the film at 2.5 out of 5 and wrote "Yogish, though impressive, struggles to give life to his tough character. Sanchita has done a neat job and Santhosh excels. Music director Abhiman Roy has composed some melodious numbers. Camerawork by R Giri is good". A critic from Sify.com wrote "It is a right kind of role for Yogish but he has to involve in avoiding inconsequential situations. Sanchitha Padukone has a good debut in Kannada. She is tall and beautiful. Srinivasamurthy and Dwarakish have nothing to boast. Abhiman Roy after a long innings has done a good job in the music. Three of his five scorings are very melodious. The lyrics are also good. Giri camera work is flawless".

References

2000s Kannada-language films
2009 films
Kannada remakes of Tamil films